is a Japanese television drama series based on the novel by Shinkai Sei. It premiered on NTV on 15 April 2015, starring Masato Sakai in the lead role. It received the viewership rating of 12.7% on average.

Cast
 Masato Sakai as Rintarō Hino, a psychiatrist
 Yū Aoi as Yumeno, a geisha who works in Shinbashi
 Michiko Kichise as Yuriko Mizushima, a surgeon and Hino's childhood friend
 Yuki Uchida as Kaoru Kiryū, a nurse
 Rin Takanashi as Yōko Kawakami, an intern who loves Hino
 Fumiyo Kohinata as Kazuo Ennōji, a hospital director
 Kimiko Yo as Ikumi Masuda, a geisha house mother
 Kenichi Endō as Shigeto Araki, Hino's senior doctor

Episodes

In other media 
In 2015, the variety show AKBingo! featured several skits titled , in which the titular doctor, portrayed by Haruka Shimazaki, is a deadpan "psychiatrist for idols" who offers dubious advice to her patients. The character has also appeared in a live performance.

References

External links
  
 
 

Japanese drama television series
2015 in Japanese television
2015 Japanese television series debuts
2015 Japanese television series endings
Nippon TV dramas
Television shows written by Miho Nakazono